The Japan Game Awards is the Japanese Ministry of Economy, Trade and Industry's awards ceremony, which was created in 1996 as the CESA Awards. While it represents the Japanese video game industry, it is not limited to Japanese video games, but also includes international video games.

METI Award Divisions

Games of the Year
The "Games of the Year Division" awards existing released works.

Future
The "Future Division" awards non-released works.

Amateur
The three-category "Amateur Division" awards original works that have not been commercially marketed regardless of whether the entrant is a juridical entity, group or individual.

History

The ceremony changed its name from launch's "CESA Awards" (CESA大賞, CESA taisho) and "CESA Game Awards" to the actual "Japan Game Awards" (日本ゲーム大賞).

The Japanese financial year runs from April 1 to March 31, it applies to all games that were released onto the Japanese market in this period.

The following are the winners of the Grand Award.

CESA Awards '96 (1996)
Sakura Wars (1996 video game) (Sega Enterprises) Sega Saturn

CESA Awards '97 (1997)
Final Fantasy VII (Square) PlayStation

The 3rd CESA Awards (1998)
The Legend of Zelda: Ocarina of Time (Nintendo) Nintendo 64

The 4th Japan Game Awards (1999)
Dokodemo Issyo (Sony Computer Entertainment) PlayStation

The 5th Japan Game Awards (2000)
Phantasy Star Online (Sega) Dreamcast

The 6th CESA Game Awards (2001~2002)
Period: January 1, 2001 to March 31, 2002
Final Fantasy X (Square) PlayStation 2

The 7th CESA Game Awards (2002~2003)
Period: April 1, 2002 to March 31, 2003
Taiko no Tatsujin: Tatakon de Dodon ga Don (Namco) PlayStation 2
Final Fantasy XI (Square) PlayStation 2, Microsoft Windows

The 8th CESA Game Awards (2003~2004)
Period: April 1, 2003 to March 31, 2004
Grand Prize  Monster Hunter (Capcom) PlayStation 2
Best Sales Award  Pokémon FireRed and LeafGreen
Global Prize (Japanese works)  WWE SmackDown! Here Comes the Pain
Global Prize (overseas works)  Need for Speed: Underground
Special Awards  EyeToy: Play, Kenshin Dragon Quest: Yomigaerishi Densetsu no Ken, Nintendo Classic NES Series

The 9th CESA Game Awards (2004~2005) 

Period: April 1, 2004 to March 31, 2005
Grand Award: Dragon Quest VIII: Journey of the Cursed King (Square-Enix) PlayStation 2
Award for Excellence: Gran Turismo 4 PS2; Sawaru Made in Wario DS; SAN NENN BGUMI KINNPACHI SENSEI DENSETSU NO KYOUDAN NI TATE PS2; Shin Sangokumusou 4 PS2

Japan Game Awards 2006 (2005~2006)
Period: April 1, 2005 to March 31, 2006
Brain Age: Train Your Brain in Minutes a Day! (Nintendo) Nintendo DS
Final Fantasy XII (Square-Enix) PlayStation 2

Japan Game Awards 2007 (2006~2007)
Period: April 1, 2006 to March 31, 2007
Wii Sports (Nintendo) Wii
Monster Hunter Freedom 2 (Capcom) PlayStation Portable

Japan Game Awards 2008 (2007~2008)
Period: April 1, 2007 to March 31, 2008
Wii Fit (Nintendo) Wii
Monster Hunter Freedom Unite (Capcom) PlayStation Portable

Japan Game Awards 2009 (2008~2009)
Period: April 1, 2008 to March 31, 2009
Mario Kart Wii (Nintendo) Wii
Metal Gear Solid 4: Guns of the Patriots (Konami Digital Entertainment) PlayStation 3

Japan Game Awards 2010 (2009~2010)
Period: April 1, 2009 to March 31, 2010

New Super Mario Bros. Wii (Nintendo) Wii

Japan Game Awards 2011 (2010~2011)
Period: April 1, 2010 to March 31, 2011

Monster Hunter Portable 3rd (Capcom) PSP

Japan Game Awards 2012 (2011~2012)
Period: April 1, 2011 to March 31, 2012

Games of the Year Division:
 Grand Award: Gravity Daze PS Vita
 Game Designers Award: Journey (video game)
 Award for Excellence: Gravity Daze, The Elder Scrolls V: Skyrim, Kid Icarus: Uprising, Super Mario 3D Land, The Legend of Zelda: Skyward Sword, Dark Souls, Final Fantasy XIII, Mario Kart 7, Monster Hunter 3, One Piece: Pirate Warrior's
 Special Award: Mushroom Garden
 Best Sales Award: Mario Kart 7
 Global Award (Japanese Product): Pokémon Black and White
 Global Award: Call of Duty: Modern Warfare 3

Japan Game Awards 2013 (2012~2013)
Period: April 1, 2012 to March 31, 2013

Minister of Economy, Trade and Industry Award: Puzzle & Dragons development team of GungHo Online Entertainment.

Games of the Year Division:
 Grand Award: Animal Crossing: New Leaf (Nintendo) 3DS
 Game Designers Award: The Unfinished Swan
 Award for Excellence: Animal Crossing: New Leaf, Resident Evil 6, Bravely Default: Flying Fairy, Dragon Quest X Online, Fantasy Life, Luigi's Mansion: Dark Moon, New Super Mario Bros. U, Phantasy Star Online 2, Pokémon Black and White 2, Soul Sacrifice, Super Danganronpa 2
 Special Award: Puzzle & Dragons
 Best Sales Award: Animal Crossing: New Leaf
 Global Award: Call of Duty: Black Ops II

Japan Game Awards 2014 (2013~2014)
Period: April 1, 2013 to March 31, 2014

Grand Prize  Monster Hunter 4 (Capcom) 3DS and Yo-kai Watch (Level-5) 3DS (tie)
Game Designer Prize  Brothers: A Tale of Two Sons
Excellence Awards  Dark Souls II, Final Fantasy XIV: A Realm Reborn, Grand Theft Auto V, Kan Colle, Metal Gear Solid V: Ground Zeroes, Monster Hunter 4, Pokémon X and Y, Puzzle & Dragons Z, Super Mario 3D World, The Last of Us, Yo-kai Watch
Special Awards  Solitiba
Best Sales Award  Pokémon X and Y
Global Prize (Japanese works)  Pokémon X and Y
Global Prize (overseas works)  Grand Theft Auto V

Japan Game Awards 2015 (2014~2015)
Period: April 1, 2014 to March 31, 2015

Grand Prize  Yo-kai Watch 2 (Level-5) 3DS
Game Designer Prize  Ingress (video game)
Excellence Awards  Super Smash Bros. for Nintendo 3DS and Wii U, Destiny, Dragon Quest Heroes: The World Tree's Woe and the Blight Below, Bloodborne, Mario Kart 8, Monster Hunter 4G, Yo-kai Watch 2, Pokémon Omega Ruby and Alpha Sapphire, Yakuza 0
Special Awards  Minecraft, Monster Strike
Best Sales Award  Yo-kai Watch 2
Global Prize (Japanese works)  Super Smash Bros. for Nintendo 3DS / Wii U
Global Prize (overseas works)  Call of Duty: Advanced Warfare

Japan Game Awards 2016 (2015~2016)
Period: April 1, 2015 to March 31, 2016

Grand Prize  Splatoon (video game) (Nintendo) Wii U
Game Designer Prize  Life Is Strange
Excellence Awards  Dark Souls III, Dragon Quest Builders, Fallout 4, Metal Gear Solid V: The Phantom Pain, Minecraft, Monster Hunter Cross, Splatoon, Super Mario Maker, The Witcher 3: Wild Hunt, Yo-kai Watch Blasters
Best Sales Award  Monster Hunter Cross
Global Prize (Japanese works)  Super Smash Bros. for Nintendo 3DS and Wii U
Global Prize (overseas works)  Call of Duty: Black Ops III

Japan Game Awards 2017 (2016~2017)
Period: April 1, 2016 to March 31, 2017

Grand Prize  The Legend of Zelda: Breath of the Wild (Nintendo, Switch)
Game Designer Prize  Inside (video game)
Excellence Awards  Resident Evil 7: Biohazard, Final Fantasy XV, Horizon Zero Dawn, Monster Hunter XX, Nier: Automata, Nioh, Overwatch, Persona 5, Pokémon Sun and Moon, The Last Guardian, The Legend of Zelda: Breath of the Wild
Special Award  PlayStation VR
Best Sales Award  Pokémon Sun and Moon
Global Prize (Japanese works)  Pokémon Sun and Moon
Global Prize (overseas works)  FIFA 17

Japan Game Awards 2018 (2017~2018)
Period: April 1, 2017 to March 31, 2018

Grand Prize  Monster Hunter: World (Capcom, PS4/PC)
Game Designer Prize  Gorogoa
Excellence Awards  Undertale, Call of Duty: WWII, Super Mario Odyssey, Splatoon 2, Xenoblade 2, Dragon Quest XI, Fate/Grand Order, Fortnite, PlayerUnknown's Battlegrounds, Pokémon Ultra Sun & Ultra Moon, Monster Hunter: World
Best Sales Award  Dragon Quest XI
Global Prize (Japanese works)  The Legend of Zelda: Breath of the Wild
Global Prize (overseas works)  Call of Duty: WWII

Japan Game Awards 2019 (2018~2019)
Period: April 1, 2018, and March 31, 2019

Grand Prize  Super Smash Bros. Ultimate (Nintendo, Nintendo Switch)
Game Designer Prize  Astro Bot Rescue Mission
Excellence Awards  , Detroit: Become Human, Marvel's Spider-Man, Super Smash Bros. Ultimate, Judgment, Dragon Quest Builders 2, Resident Evil 2 (2019 video game), Apex Legends, Devil May Cry 5, Sekiro: Shadows Die Twice, Kingdom Hearts III
Special Award   Nintendo Labo
Best Sales Award  Super Smash Bros. Ultimate
Global Prize (Japanese works)  Super Smash Bros. Ultimate
Global Prize (overseas works)  Red Dead Redemption 2

Japan Game Awards 2020 (2019~2020)
Period: April 1, 2019, and March 31, 2020

Grand Prize  Animal Crossing: New Horizons (Nintendo, Nintendo Switch)
Game Designer Prize  Baba is You
Excellence Awards  13 Sentinels: Aegis Rim, Animal Crossing: New Horizons, Death Stranding, Fire Emblem: Three Houses, Monster Hunter World: Iceborne, Nioh 2, Persona 5 Royal, Pokémon Sword and Shield, Ring Fit Adventure, Yakuza: Like a Dragon
Special Award   Dragon Quest Walk
Best Sales Award  Pokémon Sword and Shield
Global Prize (Japanese works)  Pokémon Sword and Shield
Global Prize (overseas works)  Call of Duty: Modern Warfare
The Minister of Economy, Trade and Industry Award  Animal Crossing: New Horizons

Japan Game Awards 2021 (2020~2021)
Period: April 1, 2020, and March 31, 2021

Grand Prize  Ghost of Tsushima (Sony Interactive Entertainment, PS4), Monster Hunter Rise (Capcom, Nintendo Switch)
Game Designer Prize  Mario Kart Live: Home Circuit
Excellence Awards  Resident Evil 3 Remake, Final Fantasy VII Remake, The Last of Us Part II, Ghost of Tsushima, Genshin Impact, Sakuna: Of Rice and Ruin, Momotaro Dentetsu: Showa, Heisei, Reiwa mo Teiban!, Buddy Mission: BOND, Uma Musume Pretty Derby, Monster Hunter Rise
Game Designer Award runner-up  It Takes Two, Ghost of Tsushima, Sakuna: Of Rice and Ruin
Best Sales Award  Momotaro Dentetsu: Showa, Heisei, Reiwa mo Teiban!
Global Prize (Japanese works)  Animal Crossing: New Horizons
Global Prize (overseas works)  Call of Duty: Black Ops Cold War
The Minister of Economy, Trade and Industry Award  Kou Shibusawa (Koei Tecmo)

Japan Game Awards 2022 (2021~2022)
Period: April 1, 2021, and March 31, 2022

Grand Prize  Elden Ring (Bandai Namco Entertainment; PS4, PS5, Windows, Xbox One, Xbox Series X/S)
Game Designer Prize  Inscryption
Excellence Awards  Resident Evil Village, Sky: Children of the Light, Tales of Arise, Lost Judgment, Final Fantasy XIV: Endwalker, Pokémon Legends: Arceus, Horizon Forbidden West, Elden Ring, Ghostwire: Tokyo, Kirby and the Forgotten Land
Game Designer Award runner-up  7 Days to End With You, Needy Streamer Overload
Best Sales Award  Pokémon Brilliant Diamond and Shining Pearl
Global Prize (Japanese works)  Pokémon Brilliant Diamond and Shining Pearl
Global Prize (overseas works)  Call of Duty: Vanguard
The Minister of Economy, Trade and Industry Award  Hidetaka Miyazaki (FromSoftware)

References

External links
Official website

1996 establishments in Japan
Awards established in 1996
Video game awards
Video gaming in Japan